Orgasmatron is the seventh studio album by English rock band Motörhead, released in July 1986 by GWR Records, the band's first album with the label.

It is the band's first album to feature two guitarists Phil "Wizzö" Campbell and Michael "Würzel" Burston, and also the only full Motörhead studio album to feature Pete Gill on the drums, although all three also played on the new tracks recorded for the compilation album No Remorse, recorded and released in 1984. This is also the band's first album featuring a four-piece band lineup, instead of a usual trio.

Background
After leaving Bronze Records on bad terms, Motörhead kept touring without the benefit of a record deal, in spite of being cited as a key influence for the thrash metal subgenre that was becoming popular with heavy metal fans in the mid-1980s. In Overkill: The Untold Story of Motörhead, Joel McIver quotes frontman Lemmy from that period:

After their ongoing lawsuit with their old label was settled in their favour, Motörhead and its management set up their own label GWR (Great Western Road) to release their music.

Recording
Orgasmatron was produced by maverick songwriter and musician Bill Laswell, who had previously produced acts as varied as Herbie Hancock, Mick Jagger, and PIL. The album was recorded in eleven days at Master Rock Studios in London. It was the band's first full studio album in three years and got Motörhead back on track after the critically acclaimed but commercially unsuccessful 1983 album Another Perfect Day, making it to number 21 in the UK charts. In his autobiography White Line Fever, Lemmy states:

Lemmy also wrote that the album title had nothing to do with the orgasm-inducing machine that appeared in the futuristic Woody Allen film Sleeper, which he had not even seen, and that the working title for the album had been Riding with the Driver. In the Motörhead documentary The Guts and the Glory, guitarist Phil Campbell laments: 

Campbell added that Laswell tried to meld "early hip-hop type sounds" with Motörhead's music and it did not come off. The title track reflects Lemmy's revulsion with hypocrisy. Joel McIver quotes Lemmy in his Motörhead memoir Overkill:The Untold Story of Motörhead:

On the Orgasmatron tour, the band once again tried to follow up the popular bomber lighting rig that they had used for years at their live shows with an "Orgasmatron machine" but the prop – like the giant iron fist prop from the Iron Fist tour – was a disaster. Lemmy recalled to Uncut's John Robinson in 2015:

The song "Orgasmatron" was re-recorded in 2000 and was available as an Internet download under the name "Orgasmatron 2000". It was later included on the band's 2003 five-disc box-set Stone Deaf Forever!.

Artwork
The album's working title was Ridin' with the Driver and later changed to Orgasmatron; it was too late for Joe Petagno to change the cover art and the train design was used. As well as alluding to the original name of the album, Petagno also commented on the concept behind the album cover on the Inferno 30th Anniversary bonus DVD: "Lemmy was living on a houseboat then, and collecting train models. He said, 'You know, Joseph, I want a fucking train.' It seemed weird to me...but, yet again it worked." The preliminary sketch had the Orgasmatron train going in the opposite direction, but Petagno "decided to turn it so it was going out of the picture rather than coming into it. It gave me a lot of trouble, because [of] trying to fit the head in front of the train with this cow scoop. But it worked in the end."

Release
Like Motörhead's previous album, Another Perfect Day, Orgasmatron had only limited commercial success. Some of the album's material remained in the band's live set on and off over the years: "Doctor Rock" opened the live sets for a time; "Built for Speed", a reference to Lemmy's drug of choice and the style of music they played, was played for some years; "Deaf Forever", "Nothing Up My Sleeve", "Mean Machine" all had a run as well.

Reception

The AllMusic review states: 

In 2005, Orgasmatron was ranked number 313 in Rock Hard magazine's book of The 500 Greatest Rock & Metal Albums of All Time.

Track listing

Sanctuary Records 2006 2CD deluxe edition
Disc one contains the original album without bonus tracks. Tracks B1 & B2 are from the "Deaf Forever" 12-inch single. Track B3 is an alternative version previously unreleased. Tracks B4-14 are of the BBC Radio 1 broadcast of the band's performance at the Kerrang! Wooargh Weekender at Caister, England, on Saturday 13 October 1984.

 Although the live recording is from 1984, it is the second-last live recording of the song "Motörhead" in a set list; as from the mid-1980s onward it was rarely played, and by the 1990s the song had been completely dropped.

Personnel 
Per the album's liner notes.
 Lemmy – bass, vocals
 Michael "Würzel" Burston – lead and rhythm guitars
 Phil "Wizzö" Campbell – rhythm and lead guitars
 Pete Gill – drums

Production
Bill Laswell – producer, engineer
Jason "Kissogram" Corsaro – producer, engineer
Vic "Chairman" Maile – producer, engineer (1996 reissue live tracks)
Damian & Jeff – mixing
 Steve Rinkoff – mixing (1996 reissue)
Nick Watson – mastering (2006 remaster)
Curt Evans – 2005 cover design
Joe Petagno – Snaggletooth

2006 deluxe edition remaster
 Steve Hammonds – release coordination
 Jon Richards – release coordination
Malcolm Dome – sleeve notes
Mick Stevenson – project consultant, photos and archive memorabilia

Charts

References

External links
 Motörhead official website

Motörhead albums
1986 albums
Albums with cover art by Joe Petagno
Albums produced by Bill Laswell